Daniel Ephrem Bouckaert (17 May 1894 – 26 December 1965) was a Belgian vaulter who competed in the 1920 Summer Olympics. In 1920 he won the gold medal in the individual vaulting competition as well as in the team vaulting event.

References

External links
profile

1894 births
1965 deaths
Belgian male equestrians
Equestrians at the 1920 Summer Olympics
Olympic equestrians of Belgium
Olympic gold medalists for Belgium
Olympic medalists in equestrian
Medalists at the 1920 Summer Olympics
20th-century Belgian people